The Persian horned viper (Pseudocerastes persicus), known as the Persian horned viper, false horned viper, and by other common names, is a species of vipers endemic to the Middle East and Asia. Like all other vipers, it is venomous.

Description

Females are usually larger than males. These snakes can attain a considerable weight relative to their size, with specimens sometimes exceeding .

The head is broad, flat, distinct from the neck and covered with small, imbricate scales. The snout is short and rounded. The nostrils are positioned dorsolaterally and have valves. The nasal scale is unbroken. The rostral scale is small and wide. The eyes are medium in size with vertically elliptical pupils. There are 15-20 interocular scales and 15-20 circumorbitals. The supraorbital hornlike structure above each eye consists of small, imbricate scales and is also present in juveniles. There are 11-14 supralabials and 13-17 sublabials. 2-4 rows of small scales separate the supralabial scales from the suboculars.

The body is covered with weakly to strongly keeled dorsal scales. On many of these, the keel terminates before the  end of the scale and forms a bump. Many others form a point. At midbody, there are 21-25 scale rows, none of them oblique. There are 134-163 ventral scales and 35-50 paired subcaudals. The tail is short.

Common names
Persian horned viper, false horned viper, Persian horned desert viper, eye-horned viper.

Etymology
The species name comes from where it is most usually found, Persia (present-day Iran), and the hornlike structures above its eyes.

Geographic range
Pseudocerastes persicus is found in Iran, Pakistan, Afghanistan, northern Oman, the United Arab Emirates, Jordan, and throughout Mesopotamia.

The type locality is listed as "Perse" (= Persia).

Habitat
This species likes sandy (but not sand dune) or basalt and limestone rock desert and hill country, usually with some vegetation. It tends to avoid areas of human habitation.

Behavior
These snakes are generally rather slow-moving and may employ various methods of locomotion, including sidewinding, serpentine, and rectilinear. They are also terrestrial and almost totally nocturnal, only being seen during the day or early evening during colder periods. It is not particularly aggressive, but will hiss loudly when disturbed. It is not capable of sinking into the sand vertically like Cerastes.
These feed mainly on lizards, small mammals, mice and occasionally small birds and arthropods, but will also eat dead food.

Reproduction
It is oviparous, and sexually mature females lay 11-21 eggs. As a result, they hatch after only 30–32 days at 31 °C and then measure  in total length. They do well in captivity and are relatively easy to breed.

Venom
Pseudocerastes persicus venom exhibits strong hemorrhagic activity typical of most vipers. No antivenom is available for bites from this species, although it is reported that a polyvalent antiserum does offer some protection.

References

Further reading

Boulenger GA. 1896. Catalogue of the Snakes in the British Museum (Natural History). Volume III., Containing the ... Viperidæ. London: Trustees of the British Museum (Natural History). (Taylor and Francis, printers). xiv + 727 pp. + Plates I.- XXV. (Genus Pseudocerastes and species Pseudocerastes persicus, p. 501).
Duméril A-M-C, Bibron G, Duméril A[HA]. 1854. Erpétologie générale ou histoire naturelle complète des reptiles. Tome septième. Deuxième partie. Comprenant l'histoire des serpents venimeux. (= General Herpetology or Complete Natural History of the Reptiles. Volume 7. Second Part. Containing the [Natural ] History of the Venomous Snakes). Paris: Roret. xii + pp. 781–1536. (Cerastes persicus, pp. 1443–1444). 
 Joger U. 1984. The venomous snakes of the Near and Middle East. Wiesbaden: Dr. Ludwig Reichert Verlag. 175 pp.
 Latifi M. 1991. The Snakes of Iran. Second Edition. Oxford, Ohio: Published by the Dept. of the Environment and the Society for the Study of Amphibians and Reptiles. 156 pp. .
 Marx H, Rabb GB. 1965. Relationships and Zoogeography of the Viperine Snakes (Family Viperidae). Fieldiana Zool. 44 (21): 162-206.
 Mendelssohn H. 1965. On the biology of venomous snakes of Israel. Part II. Israeli Journal of Zoology 14: 185-212.
Obst FJ. 1983. Zur Kenntnis der Schlangengattung Vipera. (= On Knowledge of the Snake Genus Vipera). Zool. Abh. staatl. Mus. Tierkunde Dresden 38: 229-235.

External links

 
 Sand viper page at Plumed Serpent. Accessed 19 August 2007.

Viperinae
Reptiles of Pakistan
Reptiles of the Middle East
Reptiles described in 1854
Taxa named by André Marie Constant Duméril
Taxa named by Gabriel Bibron
Taxa named by Auguste Duméril
Snakes of Jordan